Qarqarat al-Kudr is a place in Saudi Arabia near Khaybar. During the Islamic prophet Muhammad's era, the Al Kudr Invasion took place here against the Banu Salim tribe. It was a watering place at the time.

The Banu Salim tribe lived in Nejd at the time
Places

See also
List of expeditions of Muhammad

References

Geography of Saudi Arabia
Islam in Saudi Arabia